Gone Fishing is a 2012 Argentine drama film directed by Carlos Sorín.

Cast
 Victoria Almeida
 Alejandro Awada

References

External links
 

2012 films
2012 drama films
2010s Spanish-language films
Films directed by Carlos Sorín
Argentine drama films
2010s Argentine films